Tlalnepantla de Baz (commonly shortened to Tlalnepantla) is a municipality in the State of Mexico.

Tlalnepantla may also refer to:

 Roman Catholic Archdiocese of Tlalnepantla, State of Mexico
 Tlalnepantla Cathedral, in Tlalnepantla de Baz, Mexico
 Tlalnepantla, Morelos, a municipality in Morelos, Mexico
 Tlalnepantla railway station, operated by Ferrocarriles Suburbanos
 Tlalnepantla Region, intrastate region within the State of Mexico
 Tlalnepantla, Tamazunchale, a town in Tamazunchale, San Luís Potosí, Mexico

See also
 Tlanepantla, a municipality in state of Puebla, Mexico